The Cabinet of Aksel V. Johannesen was the government of the Faroe Islands from 15 September 2015 until 16 September 2019, with Aksel V. Johannesen from Social Democratic Party (Javnaðarflokkurin) as Prime Minister,  making a coalition between Social Democratic Party, Republic and Progress. The cabinet consists of four men and four women; this is the first time ever, there has been sex equality in the Faroese government.

See also 
Cabinet of the Faroe Islands
List of members of the Løgting, 2015–19

References 

Cabinets of the Faroe Islands
2015 in the Faroe Islands